Autostrada del Brennero S.p.A., is the operator of Italian A22 motorway.

Shareholders

 Trentino – South Tyrol autonomous region (32.2893%)
 Autonomous Province of Trentino (7.9326%)
 directly (5.3359%)
 Cassa del Trentino (2.5967%)
 Infrastrutture CIS (7.8275%)
 Autonomous Province of South Tyrol (7.6265%)
 Province of Verona (5.5128%)
 Comune of Verona (5.5087%)
 Province of Modena (4.2410%)
 Serenissima Partecipazioni (a subsidiary of A4 Holding, A4 Holding is a subsidiary of Abertis) (4.2327%)
 Comune of Trento (4.2319%)
 Comune of Bolzano (4.2268%)
 Province of Mantua (4.2029%)
 Province of Reggio Emilia (2.5010%)
 Mantua Chamber of Commerce (2.4970%)
 Comune of Mantua (2.1159%)
 Banco Popolare (1.9973%)
 Verona Chamber of Commerce (1.6972%)
 Bolzano Chamber of Commerce (0.8414%)
 Trento Chamber of Commerce (0.3370%)
 Condotte d'Acqua (0.1000%)
 Treasury shares (0.0804%)

References

External links
 Balance Sheets and Financial Statements

Private road operators of Italy
Companies based in Trentino
Region-owned companies of Italy
Government of Trentino-Alto Adige/Südtirol
Government of South Tyrol
Government of Trentino
Province of Modena
Province of Reggio Emilia
Province of Mantua
Province of Verona
Verona
Bolzano
Trento
Mantua
Transport in Emilia-Romagna
Transport in Lombardy
Transport in Veneto
Transport in Trentino-Alto Adige/Südtirol